Star chitak is a village in Ardino Municipality, Kardzhali Province, southern-central Bulgaria. It covers an area of 1.505 square kilometres and as of 2013 it had a population of 25 people.

References

Villages in Kardzhali Province